Nebbie e delitti is an Italian crime television series. It is distributed as Fog and Crimes in the United States and Canada.

Cast

Luca Barbareschi: Inspector Soneri
Natasha Stefanenko: Angela Cornelio
Gianluca Gobbi: Juvara
Giuseppe Antignati: Draghi 
Mariano Rigillo: Capuozzo

 Guest stars
Valeria Sabel (Ghitta Tagliavini, episode: L'affittacamere, 2005)
Lucrezia Lante Della Rovere (Elvira Codoppi, episode: L'affittacamere, 2005)
Francesco Salvi (Commissario Bondan, episode Bersaglio - l'oblio 2005)
Ivano Marescotti (episode Casa di bambola 2007)
Daniela Poggi (episode La amico ritrovato 2007)
Sara D'Amario (episode Carte false 2007)
Roberto Herlitzka (episode La stanza segreta 2009)
Valeria Cavalli (episode Ragazzi di buona famiglia 2009)

See also
List of Italian television series

External links
 

Italian television series
2005 Italian television series debuts
2009 Italian television series endings
2000s Italian television series
RAI original programming